is a Japanese manga series by Natsumi Aida. Switch Girl!! was serialized in the monthly  manga magazine Margaret from 19 August 2006 to 4 January 2014. A live-action television drama adaptation ran on Fuji TV Two from 24 December 2011 and 18 February 2012, with a second season broadcast from 7 December 2012 to 25 January 2013.

Plot

Nika Tamiya, the most popular girl at her high school, is a "switch girl" — in public, she is in her "on" mode, where she is as a put-together, charismatic, and fashionable girl. However, in private, she is in her "off" mode, where she is unorganized, unfeminine, and lazy. One day, Arata Kamiyama transfers into her class and moves into her apartment building. Not only does Arata discover Nika's secret, but he also has an "on" and "off" mode, where his "off" mode reveals he is secretly handsome. As Nika urges Arata to keep her "off" mode a secret, the two begin to learn more about each other and fall in love.

Characters

; played by: Mariya Nishiuchi
Nika is a high school student who describes herself as a "switch girl" with an "on" and "off" mode. Her "on" mode is her perfectly cultivated public image, while her "off" mode reveals she is lazy and unfashionable. Due to her popularity at school, she struggles to keep her "off" mode a secret.

; played by: Renn Kiriyama
Arata is a transfer student in Nika's class who moves into her apartment building, and, like Nika, he has an "on" and "off" mode. His "on" mode has him wear glasses and appear inconspicuously, while his "off" mode reveals he is handsome and attractive. Arata's "on" mode is to avoid attracting unwanted attention.

Media

Manga

Switch Girl!! is written and illustrated by Natsumi Aida. It was serialized in the monthly  manga magazine Margaret from 19 August 2006 to 4 January 2014. The chapters were later released in 25 bound volumes by Shueisha under the Margaret Comics imprint.

A vomic (voice comic) adaptation of the first chapter was released in 2009.

Television drama

Switch Girl!! was adapted into a television drama series, which was broadcast on Fuji TV Two from 24 December 2011 to 18 February 2012. The series stars Mariya Nishiuchi as Nika and Renn Kiriyama as Arata. The theme song for the series is "Love Brick" by Nana Mizuki.

A second season titled Switch Girl!! 2 aired on Fuji TV Two from 7 December 2012 to 25 January 2013. The theme song is "Happy Go Round" by Nana Mizuki.

Part of the first season was screened at Japan Expo 2012 in Paris to promote the home release for regional French audiences. Mariya Nishiuchi, who stars as Nika, appeared as a guest during the event. In 2020, AsianCrush acquired the English distribution rights for the first season.

Season 1 (2011)

Season 2: Switch Girl!! 2 (2012)

Reception
It was number 42 in the list of top-selling manga in 2011 in Japan, with 1,095,914 copies.

References

External links
Official website of the season 2 of the TV drama 

2011 Japanese television series debuts
2013 Japanese television series endings
2014 comics endings
Comedy anime and manga
Fuji TV dramas
Japanese romantic comedy television series
Shōjo manga
Shueisha franchises
Shueisha manga
Teen comedy comics